Daunt is the surname of the following people

Achilles Daunt (1832–1878), Irish churchman 
Ernest Daunt (1909–1966), Irish archdeacon 
James Daunt (born in 1963), British businessman
John Daunt (1832–1886), British Victoria Cross recipient
John Daunt (golfer) (1865–1952), British golfer
Michael Daunt (1909–1991), British pilot test
Seton Daunt, English guitarist
Timothy Daunt (born in 1935), Isle of Man Lieutenant Governor
Yvonne Daunt (1899–1962), dancer at the Paris Opera

See also
Daunt Books, British chain of bookshops